The Tulkarm Governorate is an administrative district and one of 16 Governorates of Palestine located in the north-western West Bank. The governorate's land area is 268 square kilometres. According to the Palestinian Central Bureau of Statistics, the governorate had a population of 172,800 inhabitants. The muhafaza or district capital is the city of Tulkarm.

Localities 
The Tulkarm Governorate has 51 localities and two refugee camps (Tulkarm Camp and Nur Shams Camp). The towns and cities mentioned below have populations of over 1,000.

Municipalities 
Anabta
Attil
Bal'a
Baqa ash-Sharqiyya
Beit Lid
Deir al-Ghusun
Qaffin
Tulkarm

Villages

See also
State of Palestine
Palestinian National Authority
Palestinian territories

References

 
Governorates of the Palestinian National Authority in the West Bank